Karl Zinsman Jr. is a Hawaiian/ Reggae multi-instrumentalist (primarily guitar), singer-songwriter, music producer, graphic designer and manager.  He is an artist/ producer and founder of the island music groups "Three Plus", "Hi-Town" and "The Brown Boys".  He is also owner of CK Music Co.

Three Plus
2003 Na Hoku Hanohano Award "3+4U" Reggae Album of The Year Winner.

Hi-Town
2010 Hawai'i Music Award "Hi-Town" Island Contemporary Album of The Year Winner

The Brown Boys
The Brown Boys perform in the Island Contemporary/ Country Music genre and are currently based out of Puna, Hawaii. The group released their debut single "Kalapana Way" on August 1, 2014 to help push the release of their upcoming album. The up tempo "hapa-haole" single, which speaks of the humble way of life residents live in the peaceful community of Kalapana, Hawaii; charted respectably well on most statewide radio stations and continues to be in heavy rotation. The Brown Boys released their self-entitled debut album on June 15, 2015.

Discography
1994 -Kanile'a Collection – 'Nahenahe' -"He Mele Lahui Hawai'i""

1998 -Na Kama – 'Ke Ala Hou' -"Prelude", "Island Woman"

1999 -Three Plus – 'Honeybaby' – Album

2001 -Mana'o Company – 'Spread A Little Aloha' -"Stepping Out/ Hawaiian Children" ft. Three Plus & Fiji, "Rock Me" ft. Three Plus & Damon Williams

2001 -Sean Na'auao – 'Still Pounding' -"Two Person Party", "Driving Me Pupule", "Don't Have To Think Twice", "Cool Operator"

2001 -KCCN FM 100 All-Star Band: Young Generation – 'Various Artists' -"Me & You", ft. Three Plus

2001 -Ernie Cruz Jr. – 'Portraits' -"Where Are The Brothers" ft. Three Plus

2001 -Baywatch Hawaii – 'Soundtrack' -"Cruzin" ft. Three Plus

2002 -Island Roots Vol.1 – 'Various Artists' -"Cool Operator"

2003 -Three Plus – 'For You' – Album

2003 -Sean Na'auao – 'Still Pounding 2' -"Mystic Man", "Who The Cap Fit"

2003 -Island Roots Vol.3 – 'Various Artists' -"Driving Me Pupule"

2004 -Kani Makou – 'Easy Stylin' -"I Wanna Be Her Man" ft. Karl Zinsman of Three Plus

2004 -Island Roots Vol.5 – 'Various Artists' -"Honeybaby"

2005 -Hawaiian Style Vol.4 – 'Various Artists' -"Don't Have To Think Twice"

2008 -Three Plus – 'The Best of Three Plus From Honeybaby to For You'

2008 -Hawaiian Style Vol.5 – 'Various Artists' -"Honeybaby"

2009 -Hi-Town – 'Hi-Town' – Album

2010 -Tribute To A Reggae Legend: Bob Marley – 'Various Artists' -"Is This Love" ft. Three Plus

2010 -Pipeline 2 Paradise – 'Paradise Pa'ina Vol.1' -"Sunshine in My Life"

2010 – Hi-Town – 'Single' -"With You"

2014 – The Brown Boys – 'Single' – "Kalapana Way"

2015 – The Brown Boys – 'The Brown Boys' – Album

References

External links
 Reverbnation.com
 Americansongspace.com

Guitarists from Hawaii
American reggae guitarists
American male guitarists
Living people
Na Hoku Hanohano Award winners
Year of birth missing (living people)